Ough may refer to:
 Ough (orthography), a letter sequence in English orthography
 Ough (surname)
 Ough, Nebraska, a community in the United States